James McLean McIlwraith (born 17 April 1954 in Troon, Scotland) is a retired professional footballer who played as a midfielder for Kilwinning Rangers, Motherwell, Bury, Portsmouth, Ayr United, Halifax Town and Highlands Park.

Career
McIlwraith started his career at Kilwinning Rangers, for whom he scored over 60 goals. He signed for Motherwell in 1973 following a trial spell with the club.

McIlwraith made 33 appearances for Motherwell from 1973 to 1975 and scored seven goals. He signed for Bury in the summer of 1975 and played in 118 matches for them, scoring 24 goals. He had two spells at Gigg Lane from September 1975 to July 1978, and from July 1979 to October 1980. In the 1978–79 season, he played for Portsmouth, making 19 appearances. He also had a month-long loan spell at Ayr United in the 1978–79 season. In October 1980, he moved to  Halifax Town and made 36 appearances with six goals. He left Halifax after the 1981–82 season, and had a three-year spell in South Africa with Highlands Park.

References

External links
 Bury F.C. in 1976–77. Bury Times.
 

1954 births
Living people
Association football midfielders
Ayr United F.C. players
Bury F.C. players
English Football League players
Expatriate soccer players in South Africa
Halifax Town A.F.C. players
Highlands Park F.C. players
Kilwinning Rangers F.C. players
Motherwell F.C. players
People from Troon
Portsmouth F.C. players
Scottish Football League players
Scottish expatriate footballers
Scottish expatriate sportspeople in South Africa
Scottish footballers
Footballers from South Ayrshire